The Recovery Console is a feature of the Windows 2000, Windows XP and Windows Server 2003 operating systems.  It provides the means for administrators to perform a limited range of tasks using a command-line interface.

Its primary function is to enable administrators to recover from situations where Windows does not boot as far as presenting its graphical user interface. The recovery console is used to provide a way to access the hard drive in an emergency through the command prompt.

As such, the Recovery Console can be accessed either through the original installation media used to install Windows, or it can also be installed to the hard drive and added to the NTLDR menu. However, relying on the latter is much more risky because it requires that the computer can boot to the point that NTLDR loads, or else it would not work at all.

Abilities 
The Recovery Console has a simple command-line interpreter (or CLI).  Many of the available commands closely resemble the commands that are normally available in cmd.exe, namely attrib, copy, del, and so forth.

From the Recovery Console an administrator can:
 create and remove directories, and copy, erase, display, and rename files  
 enable and disable services (which modifies the service control database in the registry, to take effect when the system is next bootstrapped)
 repair boot file, using the bootcfg command
 write a new master boot record to a disk, using the fixmbr command
 write a new volume boot record to a volume, using the fixboot command
 format volumes
 expand files from the compressed format in which they are stored on the installation CD-ROM
 perform a full chkdsk scan to repair corrupted disks and files, especially if the computer cannot be started properly

Filesystem access on the Recovery Console is by default severely limited.  An administrator using the Recovery Console has only read-only access to all volumes except for the boot volume, and even on the boot volume only access to the root directory and to the Windows system directory (e.g. \WINNT). This can be changed by changing Security Policies to enable read/write access to the complete file system including copying files from removable media (i.e. floppy drives).

Commands 
The following is a list of the Recovery Console internal commands:

 attrib
 batch
 bootcfg (introduced in Windows XP)
 cd
 chdir
 chkdsk
 cls
 copy
 del
 delete
 dir
 disable
 diskpart
 enable
 exit
 expand
 fixboot
 fixmbr
 format
 help
 listsvc
 logon
 map
 md
 mkdir
 more
 rd
 ren
 rename
 rmdir
 set (introduced in Windows XP)
 systemroot
 type

Although it appears in the list of commands available by using the help command, and in many articles about the Recovery Console (including those authored by Microsoft), the net command is not available.  No protocol stacks are loaded, so there is no way to connect to a shared folder on a remote computer as implied.

See also 
 Emergency Repair Disk
 Comparison of command shells

References

External links 
 Description of the Recovery Console

Windows components
Windows command shells